Green Mountain Party may refer to:

 a Vermont political party founded in 2015. In 2018 party chairman Neil Johnson came in last with 385 votes for the Washington-7 Vermont House of Representatives seat
 Green Mountain Peace and Justice Party, Vermont political party formerly known as Liberty Union Party

See also 
 Green Party (disambiguation)
 Mountain Party, West Virginia, affiliated with the Green Party of the United States